|}

Yang Shu-chun or Judy Yang (born October 26, 1985 in Yingge, Taipei County, now New Taipei City) is a female Taiwanese taekwondo athlete. She won the women's flyweight (under 51 kg) gold medal at the 2008 Asian Taekwondo Championships.

At the 2010 Asian Games in Guangzhou, China on November 17, she was controversially disqualified near the end of the first round when she was leading 9-0 against her Vietnamese opponent Vu Thi Hau. "Unauthorized" electronic sensors were allegedly found in her socks before or during the match. Yang's equipment had passed the pre-match inspection. After the disqualification, Yang protested the judgement in tears and refused to leave the mat. Yang's disqualification drew a furious response from media and fans in Taiwan. In December 2010, Yang was banned by the World Taekwondo Federation (WTF) from participating any international Taekwondo competitions for three months, her coach Liu Tsung-ta was suspended for 20 months and the Chinese Taipei Taekwondo Federation was fined $50,000. The Sports Affairs Council of Taiwan filed an appeal with the Court of Arbitration for Sports based in Lausanne.

After her suspension, in May 2011, Yang competed at the 2011 World Taekwondo Championships held in Gyeongju, South Korea, and won a silver medal in the –49 kg category losing to China's Wu Jingyu 6–2 in the final.

In July 2011, Yang withdrew the appeal over her disqualification.

In the 2012 London Olympics, Yang lost to Chanatip Sonkham of Thailand in the quarterfinals.

References

External links
 
 

1985 births
Living people
Taiwanese female taekwondo practitioners
Asian Games medalists in taekwondo
Olympic taekwondo practitioners of Taiwan
Sportspeople from New Taipei
Taekwondo practitioners at the 2008 Summer Olympics
Taekwondo practitioners at the 2012 Summer Olympics
Taekwondo practitioners at the 2006 Asian Games
Taekwondo practitioners at the 2010 Asian Games
Asian Games silver medalists for Chinese Taipei
Medalists at the 2006 Asian Games
Universiade medalists in taekwondo
Universiade silver medalists for Chinese Taipei
World Taekwondo Championships medalists
Asian Taekwondo Championships medalists
Medalists at the 2005 Summer Universiade
Medalists at the 2009 Summer Universiade